SS Sicamous is a large four decked sternwheeler commissioned by the Canadian Pacific Railway (CPR) and built by the Western Dry Dock and Shipbuilding Company for Okanagan Lake service between the fruit communities of Penticton, and other towns of Kelowna and Vernon, British Columbia. SS Sicamous launched in 1914, Sicamous ran for many years connecting rail lines and areas. The vessel operated until 1937 and is currently beached as a part of a heritage shipyard operated by the S.S. Sicamous Restoration Society in Penticton. The vessel today is operated both as a museum and events and banquet facility.

Form
Built in 1914, Sicamous made daily trips around Okanagan Lake until 1936, with her last official voyage in 1937. Throughout her twenty-two years of official service, Sicamous remained an important link within the transportation system of the Okanagan. Sicamous now resides in Penticton where she continues to undergo restoration.
Sicamous had the following dimensions:
  Length: 200.5 ft (registered); 228 ft (overall)
  Breadth: 40 ft
  Height (main deck to pilot house): 53 ft
  Gross Tonnage: 1786.65 tons
  Net Tonnage: 994.38 tons
Although passengers would board the ship on the cargo deck, their access was limited to the bow. After boarding they would head up either one of the two exterior staircases leading to the saloon deck. The saloon deck was home to the exquisite dining hall featuring an impressive mezzanine balcony and clerestory windows. Located at the bow was the Gentlemen’s Saloon with bar, while the stern housed the Ladies Saloon complete with a beautiful bridal suite. Above the saloon deck was the observation deck or gallery deck. This was where passengers would go to admire the beautiful view of Okanagan Lake and the surrounding area. Much like the saloon deck, ladies and gentlemen each had their own separate observation area with women observing at the bow, and men at the stern. Just beneath the Pilot House was the Texas Deck. This area served as a casual meeting place for the captain and his crew.

The Kettle Valley Railway, which ran along the East side of Okanagan Lake, as well as the construction of the highway along the West side and also the Great Depression in the 1930s contributed to Sicamous losing money for the CPR. As a result, the CPR decided to renovate Sicamous, removing the Texas Deck and two thirds of the observation deck. These changes were designed to reduce wind resistance and weight, decreasing coal consumption and allowing for more cargo to be transported. Despite her decrease in size, Sicamous remained a first-class steamship with the same fine Australian mahogany and Burmese teak finishings.

Function
Sicamous was a steam-driven sternwheeler, consuming an average of fifteen to seventeen tons of coal each day, depending upon weather conditions and the number of stops made along the lake. Today Sicamous remains the largest steam-powered, steel-hulled sternwheeler in Canada.
Twenty-three feet long and made of Carnegie flange steel, the boiler was designed to burn 1720 kilograms of coal each hour. It was important to maintain a large and very hot fire burning within the boiler. Surrounding the fire was a steel chamber containing water pulled from the lake as well as 320 hollow tubes. These tubes would heat rapidly, quickly turning the water to steam. Pressure would build and the temperature would rise. The steam pressure was constantly monitored and maintained at 160 psi by a fireman or an engineer who was responsible for manually releasing steam as needed. This steam would travel from the boiler to the engines via the bulkhead, a large tube attached to the ceiling of the bilge. Sicamous had two engines, each with a low- and high-pressure cylinder. Steam would travel from cylinder to cylinder, moving pistons which were attached to the ships pitman arms. These pitman arms were connected to the wooden stern wheel and moved completely out of phase with one another, distributing power equally to both sides of the stern wheel.

Purpose
Built in 1914 and retired in 1936, Sicamous dedicated twenty-two years of service to the CPR, the people of the Okanagan and those simply travelling through. Although always a first-class steamship complete with luxurious staterooms and cabins, Sicamous was renovated in 1935 and became primarily a cargo vessel, reducing her total number of berths from 80 to 20. This change was in hopes of serving the people of the valley better while increasing her profits.
Operation:
Construction of Sicamous began September 1913 and continued throughout winter, finishing in the spring of 1914. The hull, engine and boiler were fabricated beforehand in Port Arthur, Ontario (Thunder Bay) and shipped to the construction site at Okanagan Landing. It took seventeen railcars to ship the prefabricated materials out West. Up to 150 men were hired to build both Sicamous and Naramata. The cost to build Sicamous alone was estimated to be $180,000 not including the additional $14,000 spent on fine furnishings.

Sicamous was launched May 19, 1914 at 2:15 in the afternoon, and had its first excursion June 12 of 1914. The first to pilot the ship was Captain George Estabrooks, followed by Captain Otto Estabrooks in 1915, Captain William Kirby in 1916, Captain George Robertson from 1917 to 1921 and lastly Captain Joseph Weeks from 1922 to 1935. To be captain of such a ship was considered to be one of the most prestigious careers in the Okanagan Valley and each captain was held in very high regard.

Crew Complement and Officers
While off duty, the twenty-four crew members aboard Sicamous would sleep in the crew’s quarters at the stern of the cargo deck. These rooms consisted of three single bunks and housed up to six men. Crew members would sleep in shifts, sharing bunks where need be. Their quarters were known for having bed bug and cockroach infestations while also being plagued by the many mosquitoes living in the valley. However, a warm place to stay overnight and three meals a day were included in the crew’s wages.
Chief Engineers aboard Sicamous included:
  William Jacobs
  D. Stephens
  D.H. Biggam
  John F. McRae
  P.H. Pearce
During World War One, many of the Lake and River Service’s skilled engineers left for battle, leaving numerous steamships, including Sicamous, without a Chief Engineer. As a result, Dave Stephens (rumored to be the D. Stephens above) filled in for the younger men who had joined the army. Dave Stephens was the British Columbia Lake and River Services’ Primary Chief Engineer and oversaw operations from Nelson. 
Captains aboard Sicamous included:
  Captain George Estabrooks (1914)
  Captain Otto Estabrooks (1915)
  Captain William Kirby (1916)
  Captain George Robertson (1917-1921)
  Captain Joseph Weeks (1922-1935)
Before he became a captain, Otto Estabrooks (at the age of fifteen) was assigned the task of relieving the night watchman. He was responsible for keeping the fire within the boiler burning strongly throughout the night. This was necessary so that Sicamous could leave on time the next morning. His recollection is included below.

"The first night I fell asleep and did not waken until 5:30 a.m., exactly in time to sound the three whistles to announce that it was a half hour before leaving time-something any kid would have loved to do all by himself. 
Rushing to the pilot house and pulling the cord, it didn’t whistle. There wasn’t enough steam. The engineer, a  gentleman  of the first water, said he forgot to tell me to keep steam up. They were kind words from a kind man, even if they were not true."

See also
 Steamboats of Lake Okanagan
 Canadian Pacific Railway Lake and River Service
 List of historic vessels in British Columbia

References

External links

British Columbia railways
Penticton
Canadian Pacific Railway
Paddle steamers of British Columbia
Tourist attractions in the Okanagan
Heritage sites in British Columbia
Museum ships in Canada
Museum ships in British Columbia
1914 ships
Steamboats of Okanagan Lake